Paper Lace are a British pop/rock band, formed in Nottingham, who rose to success in 1974 and during that year had three UK Top 40 hit singles. In the United States they are considered a one-hit wonder, having a single US top 40 hit. There are two active bands featuring members from the hits period using the name Paper Lace or a derivation of it.

History
The core of the band originally formed in 1967 as Music Box, members being Cliff Fish, Dave Manders, Roy White and Phil Wright, the band performing covers by the likes of the Beach Boys. In 1969 they changed their name to Paper Lace. They worked their way through small club gigs, a season at Tiffany's, a Rochdale club, and in 1971 at The Birdcage in Ashton-Under-Lyne. Paper Lace released First Edition, the first of two studio albums in 1972 but, despite some TV appearances, mainstream success was not achieved until a 1973 victory on Opportunity Knocks, the ITV talent contest series.

The band had originally auditioned for Opportunity Knocks in 1970, but were not called to appear until 1973. According to Phil Wright (then lead singer, now lead singer of Phil Wright's Original 70s Paper Lace) the band initially questioned appearing. However, with the show having weekly viewing figures of 7 million, they concluded that going on the programme was a "no brainer", and the band won Opportunity Knocks for five consecutive weeks.

On the basis of Opportunity Knocks' performances, songwriters Mitch Murray and Peter Callander offered the band "Billy Don't Be a Hero", with the possibility of more songs if it took off. "Billy Don't Be a Hero" would spend three weeks at Number 1 on the UK Singles Chart in March 1974, with a total of 14 weeks on the chart. It was followed by another Murray/Callander composition, the story song "The Night Chicago Died" which reached Number 3 and spent 11 weeks on the charts. A third Murray/Callander-penned release, "The Black-Eyed Boys", took Paper Lace to number 11 in late 1974 and number 37 in Canada.

With their subject matter assumed in America to be about the Vietnam war, it was logical that "Billy Don't Be a Hero" should become a hit in the United States. However, Bo Donaldson and the Heywoods were the first to release the song in the United States, and Paper Lace had to be content with a No. 96 placing. However, the follow-up song "The Night Chicago Died", set in the Prohibition era with reference to Al Capone, had no such competition and despite contractual hassles preventing the band from performing the song in America, it would top the Billboard Hot 100. "The Night Chicago Died" sold over three million copies and was awarded a gold disc by the R.I.A.A. in August 1974.

Also in 1974 the band released its second of two studio albums, Paper Lace and Other Bits of Material (1974). The band line-up covering the three hit single releases consisted of Philip Wright on drums/lead vocals, Mick Vaughan on lead and rhythm guitar, Cliff Fish on bass guitar, and Chris Morris on guitar and vocals. Carlo Paul Santanna joined Paper Lace as a fifth band member during 1974.

Paper Lace were reportedly the most successful band Nottingham ever produced, and were invited to perform on the Royal Variety Performance in front of the Queen Mother. However, as musical tastes/styles evolved in the mid-70s the band's popularity waned and by early 1976 Vaughan, Morris and Santanna had left the band, replaced alongside Wright and Fish by Jamie Moses and from 1975 to 1978 Peter Oliver (previously with The New Seekers).

In 1978, the band surfaced briefly with a sing-along version of "We've Got the Whole World in Our Hands" with their local football team, Nottingham Forest F.C. (Sendra, 2006). The 7-inch single, with "The Nottingham Forest March" as the B-side, spent six weeks on the UK chart and reached Number 24, but went Top 10 in the Netherlands. Chris Raynor, who had formerly been Billy Fury's guitarist, joined Paper Lace in 1978.

Paper Lace finally came to an end in 1980, but Morris and Raynor re-formed the group in 1983 with a new line-up that did not include Wright or Fish.

In 1990, three original Paper Lace members, Philip Wright, Mick Vaughan and Chris Morris, were given the financial backing to re-record "Billy Don't Be a Hero" with an up-to-date sound. However, this was never released, because when the Gulf War began the BBC produced a list of songs it deemed inappropriate at the time, which included "Billy Don't Be A Hero".

In 1997, Wright joined Sons and Lovers. He continues to be listed as a member.

In 2011 Carlo Paul Santanna re-joined Morris' and Raynor's Paper Lace. The line-up today of the band with the Paper Lace name is Carlo Paul Santanna (lead vocal, guitar), Chris Raynor (lead guitar, vocal), Graham Wyvill (bass, vocal) and John Raynor (drums, vocal). Chris Morris is noted as available for selected dates. Phil Wright continues to perform with a band that uses a direct derivation of the Paper Lace name, Phil Wright's Original 70s Paper Lace. The line-up today of Phil Wright's band is Phil Wright [drums, lead vocal], Cliff Fish [bass and vocals], Dave Major [keyboards and vocals] & Phil Hendriks [lead guitar and vocals].

From 2015 Wright has been a member of The Original Jukebox Heroes, a band consisting of a selection of other members with a legacy in the glam rock era. The Original Jukebox Heroes line-up also includes two members of Wright's Paper Lace line-up, Dave Major and Phil Hendricks.

Hit era band members
Phil Wright (born Philip Wright, 9 April 1948, St. Ann's, Nottingham, England) — drums/lead vocals
Mick Vaughan (born Robert Michael Vaughan, 27 July 1950, Sheffield, Yorkshire) – lead/rhythm guitar/arranger
Cliff Fish (born Clifford Victor Fish, 13 August 1949, Ripley, Derbyshire) – bass guitar
Chris Morris (born Christopher Morris, 1 November 1954, Nottingham, England) – guitar/vocals
Carlo Santanna – from 1974 (born Carlo Paul Santanna, 29 June 1947, Nottingham, England) guitar/mandolin/vocals

Discography

Studio albums

Singles

CD releases
Paper Lace and Other Material / First Edition (Double CD) – Cherry Red / 7t's Label Cat No. Glam Cdd 109; both albums, plus B-sides to all singles released until 1975

Notes

References

External links
 Official facebook page (Phil Wright's original 70s Paper Lace)
 Official website (current band with the Paper Lace name)

English pop music groups
Musical groups from Nottingham